The 1968 Arizona Wildcats football team represented the University of Arizona in the Western Athletic Conference (WAC) during the 1968 NCAA University Division football season.  In their second and final season under head coach Darrell Mudra, the Wildcats compiled an 8–3 record (5–1 against WAC opponents), finished in a tie for second place in the WAC, lost to Auburn in the Sun Bowl, and outscored their opponents, 186 to 149.  The team played its home games in Arizona Stadium in Tucson, Arizona.

The team's statistical leaders included Mark Driscoll with 927 passing yards, Noki Fulmaono with 579 rushing yards, and Ron Gardin with 892 receiving yards.

Mudra stepped down as Arizona coach at the end of the season to accept the head coaching position at Western Illinois, and the Wildcats had to find a new coach for the 1969 season.

Schedule

Game summaries

Arizona State

Prior to the matchup against Arizona State, Wildcat coach Mudra contacted the Sun Bowl committee about the possibility of having the winner of the Arizona–ASU game play in the bowl game. Wyoming, the eventual WAC winner, had won the conference in the previous two seasons, but lost to Arizona in their head-to-head matchup in 1968 and defeated ASU. As a result, Arizona had a slight better conference record that both Wyoming and ASU and Mudra issued an ultimatum to the Sun Bowl committee that Arizona would either be invited to play regardless of the result of the ASU game or not play a bowl at all. The committee chose the Wildcats to appear in the bowl, much to the anger of ASU and their fans.

In the rivalry game itself, Arizona State shook off the controversy and defeated Arizona in a game that was known to fans as the “Ultimatum Bowl”. ASU was left out of a bowl game due to a lack of bowl games available at the time.

Auburn (Sun Bowl)

In their first bowl appearance since 1948, the Wildcats took on Auburn from the SEC. After a 10–10 tie at the half, the Tigers broke the game open in the second half on its way to a 34–10 victory.

Season notes
 Due to the controversy surrounding the decision of the Sun Bowl inviting Arizona over ASU, it led to the creation of the Fiesta Bowl in 1971, that at least guaranteed the WAC champion at the time to play in the game regardless of whether or not Arizona State appears in it. Arizona first appeared in the bowl in 1979.
 This was the second consecutive season in which the Wildcats defeated Air Force by an identical 14–10 score.
 Arizona defeated Wyoming (who went on to clinch the WAC title) in the season. The win over likely prevented Wyoming from earning a bowl bid along with the “Ultimatum Bowl” fiasco (see above).

References

Arizona
Arizona Wildcats football seasons
Arizona Wildcats football